Katukan or Katookan may refer to:
 Katukan, Iranshahr
 Katukan, Mehrestan